Genko's Forest Belt is a system of historic forest belts in Russia's Ulyanovsk Oblast. Planted over a century ago, it is now considered a "natural monument", and is legally protected as one of the protected areas of Ulyanovsk Oblast.

History
In 1886-1903, watershed protection forest belt planting was carried out in this area.  The project was initiated by the well-known Russian forester, Nestor Karlovich  Genko (1839-1904). The windbreak forest strips planted under his plan are still considered both to be beneficial for the local agriculture and to be of interest for researchers.

Current state
The plantings are in a good condition, and naturally  regenerate. In some areas, they are already composed of the second generation of trees. The most common tree species occurring in the forest strips are: oak, maple, pine, birch, linden, elm.

Construction work, agricultural activity, felling of trees (except for removal of dead trees, etc. for the forest maintenance purposes) are prohibited in the forest strip.

References

External links 
 https://web.archive.org/web/20071231205649/http://eco.ulstu.ru/
 

Protected areas of Russia
1989 establishments in Russia
Protected areas established in 1989
Geography of Ulyanovsk Oblast
Forests of Russia
Forestry in Russia
Belt regions